The Siemens Energy Sector was one of the four sectors of German industrial conglomerate Siemens. Founded on January 1, 2009, it generated and delivered power from numerous sources including the extraction, conversion and transport of oil and natural gas in addition to renewable and alternative energy sources. As of October 1, 2014, the sector level has been eliminated, including the Siemens Energy Sector.

Divisions 
The Siemens Energy Sector consists of the following divisions:
 
 Renewable Energy (CEO: Dr. René Umlauft)
 Power Generation (CEO: Roland Fischer)
 Power Transmission (CEO: Jan Mrosik)
 Energy Service (CEO: Tim Holt)

Products and services 
 50-Hz and 60-Hz gas and steam turbine generators for large-scale and industrial applications up to 1,100 MW
 Turnkey fossil-fueled power plants
 Factory and field-based service for gas, steam, nuclear and wind turbine generators, as well as other plant equipment
 Power plant modernizations, upgrades and extended service agreements
 Wind power turbines and wind farms
 Fuel flexible gasifiers for integrated gasification combined cycle 
 Turnkey substations
 Gas-insulated switchgear
 High-voltage circuit breakers, voltage regulators and surge arresters
 FACTS (flexible alternating current transmission systems) and high-voltage direct current transmission (HVDC) solutions
 Transformers for high voltage applications
 Process control, power management systems and decision support tools for plant and network operators
 Air pollution control equipment
 Turbocompressors for petrochemical, refining, oil and gas, and chemical applications
 Training and consulting services.

Acquisitions and partners 

Siemens has acquired the following companies:
 Marine Current Turbines; development of marine current turbines to generate power tidal power (February 2012)
 NEM; specialist in heat recovery steam generators for combined cycle (gas and steam) power plants, the Netherlands (2011)
 Bennex Group AS and Poseidon Group AS of the Subsea Technology Group AG, Norway, producing subsea power equipment (2011)
 Elektrozavod in Ufa (Russia) produces circuit breakers and disconnectors for high-voltage switchgear in Russia (2010)
 Steinmüller Engineering; process in the field of energy and environmental technology, acquisition of a majority stake (2009)
 Advanced Burner Technologies Inc. (ABT) in Pluckemin, New Jersey (USA); investment in service business for monitoring and reducing pollutants in power plants (2006)
 Kühnle, Kopp & Kausch, small industrial steam turbines up to 5 MW  (2006)
 Energy transmission and distribution divisions of VA Tech (2005)
 Wheelabrator Air Pollution Control Inc. in Pittsburgh, Pennsylvania (USA) and Wheelabrator Canada Company, products and systems for monitoring and reducing pollutants in power plants (2005)
 Bonus Energy; a wind energy provider (2004)
 Industrial turbine business of Alstom (2003)
 Westinghouse Electric Corporation in Orlando, Florida (USA) with the locations in Charlotte, North Carolina; Fort Payne, Alabama; and Winston-Salem, North Carolina (1998)

Partners:
 Shanghai Electric, two joint ventures (JV), 49% stake in each; one JV for the development and construction of wind turbines, second JV for the sales, project management, and service of wind turbines in China (2011)
 20% minority stake in Semprius; development of high concentration photovoltaic (HCPV) modules (2011)
 Joint venture with ZAO Iskra-Avigaz: LCC Russian Turbo Machinery, production of compressors for gas pipelines (2010)
 Shanghai Electric Power Generation Equipment Co., Ltd. (SEPG), 40% stake, products and solutions for power generation with coal and gas-fired power plants (2010)
 A2SEA A/S; services in the field of offshore wind farms, 49% stake (2010)
 Joint venture with Voith Hydro Holding GmbH & Co. KG, 35% stake in Voith Hydro, mechanical and electrical equipment for hydroelectric power plants (2000)

Figures 
In financial year 2013 the Energy Sector earned approximately €26.6 billion in revenue and had 83,500 employees.

References

External links 
 Website Siemens Energy
 Press Website Energy Sector
 Lisa Davis

Siemens
Conglomerate companies of Germany
Electrical engineering companies of Germany
Gas turbine manufacturers
Steam turbine manufacturers
Wind turbine manufacturers
Water turbine manufacturers
Companies based in Berlin
Companies based in Erlangen
Energy companies established in 2008
Companies formerly listed on the Frankfurt Stock Exchange